Stephen Downes is a Canadian e-learning theorist and practitioner.

Stephen Downes may also refer to:
Stephen Downes (footballer) (born 1981), English footballer
Steven Downes (born 1961), English sports journalist
Steve Downes, American voice actor and DJ
Steve Downs, guitarist of the band Damiera